Theodoros  Asteriadis (born May 24, 1972, in Thessaloniki) is a retired Greek professional basketball player.

Early years
Asteriadis joined at PAOK when he was eight years old, and he won the Greek Championship for Cadets in 1988 and the Greek Championship for Junior Men in 1990. He made his debut in Greek Basketball League during 1989–90 season

Professional career
Asteriadis signed his first professional with PAOK in 1991. He won the Greek Basketball League Championship in 1992 and he played in 1991–92 FIBA European Cup, having 5.7 points average. In 1992 he moved to Sporting B.C. His club was relegated after an 80–78 defeat from Pagrati B.C. Asteriadis send the game into the overtime with a three-point shot from the half of the court. In 1993 he signed with Iraklis Thessaloniki B.C., and he played until 1996. He helped his club to qualify in 1995–96 FIBA European League for the first time in its history. Asteriadis, during 1995–96 season had 3.7 points per game at FIBA European League. He finished his career playing for M.E.N.T. B.C. in Greek A2 Basket League. After, his retirement he became a basketball coach for PAOK academies.

National team
Asteriadis won the gold medal in 1989 FIBA Europe Under-16 Championship. He also played in 1993 Mediterranean Games, and he took the fourth place. Moreover, he played at FIBA Under-21 World Championship in 1993.

Personal
His father Asterios was also basketball player, who won the Greek championship with PAOK in 1959. His son Asterios (born 2003) is also a professional player.

References

External links
at fibaeurope.com
at basket.gr
at esake.gr

1972 births
Greek men's basketball players
Living people
Iraklis Thessaloniki B.C. players
MENT B.C. players
P.A.O.K. BC players
Sporting basketball players
Guards (basketball)
Competitors at the 1993 Mediterranean Games
Mediterranean Games competitors for Greece
Basketball players from Thessaloniki